The following outline is provided as an overview of and topical guide to Tanzania:

Tanzania – sovereign country located in East Africa.  Tanzania borders Kenya and Uganda on the north, Rwanda, Burundi and the Democratic Republic of the Congo on the west, and Zambia, Malawi and Mozambique on the south.  To the east it borders the Indian Ocean.

General reference 

 Pronunciation: , 
 Common English country name:  Tanzania
 Official English country name:  The United Republic of Tanzania
 Common endonym(s):  
 Official endonym(s):  
 Adjectival(s): Tanzanian
 Demonym(s):
 Etymology: Name of Tanzania
 International rankings of Tanzania
 ISO country codes:  TZ, TZA, 834
 ISO region codes:  See ISO 3166-2:TZ
 Internet country code top-level domain:  .tz

Geography of Tanzania 

Geography of Tanzania
 Tanzania is: a country
 Location:
 Southern Hemisphere and Eastern Hemisphere
 Africa
 East Africa
 Time zone:  East Africa Time (UTC+03)
 Extreme points of Tanzania
 High:   Mount Kilimanjaro  – highest point in Africa
 Low:  Indian Ocean 0 m
 Land boundaries:  3,861 km
 769 km
 756 km
 475 km
 459 km
 451 km
 396 km
 338 km
 217 km
 Coastline: Indian Ocean 1,424 km
 Population of Tanzania: 59,441,988 - 24th most populous country

 Area of Tanzania: 945,203 km2
 Atlas of Tanzania

Environment of Tanzania 

 Climate of Tanzania
 Ecoregions in Tanzania
 Protected areas of Tanzania
 Biosphere reserves in Tanzania
 National parks of Tanzania
 Wildlife of Tanzania
 Fauna of Tanzania
 Birds of Tanzania
 Mammals of Tanzania

Natural geographic features of Tanzania 

 Glaciers of Tanzania (All located on the summit of Mount Kilimanjaro)
 Islands of Tanzania
 Lakes of Tanzania
 Mountains of Tanzania
 Kipengere Range
 Loleza Mountain
 Mount Hanang
 Mount Kilimanjaro
 Mount Loolmalasin
 Mount Meru
 Nguru Mountains
 Ol Doinyo Lengai
 Pare Mountains
 Poroto Mountains
 Udzungwa Mountains
 Usambara Mountains
 Volcanoes in Tanzania
 Rivers of Tanzania
 World Heritage Sites in Tanzania

Regions of Tanzania

Ecoregions of Tanzania 

List of ecoregions in Tanzania
 Ecoregions in Tanzania

Administrative divisions of Tanzania 

Administrative divisions of Tanzania
 Regions of Tanzania
 Districts of Tanzania

Regions of Tanzania 

Regions of Tanzania

Arusha (Arusha)
Dar es Salaam
Dodoma (Dodoma)
Geita (Geita)
Iringa (Iringa)
Kagera (Bukoba)
Katavi (Mpanda)
Kigoma (Kigoma)
Kilimanjaro (Moshi)
Lindi (Lindi)
Manyara (Babati)
Mara (Musoma)
Mbeya (Mbeya)
Morogoro (Morogoro)
Mtwara (Mtwara)
Mwanza (Mwanza)
Njombe (Njombe)
Pemba North (Wete)
Pemba South (Mkoani)
Pwani (Kibaha)
Rukwa (Sumbawanga)
Ruvuma (Songea)
Shinyanga (Shinyanga)
Simiyu (Bariadi)
Singida (Singida)
Tabora (Tabora)
Tanga (Tanga)
Zanzibar Central/South (Koani)
Zanzibar North (Mkokotoni)
Zanzibar Urban/West (Zanzibar)

Districts of Tanzania 

Districts of Tanzania

 Arumeru
 Arusha
 Karatu
 Monduli
 Ngorongoro
 Ilala
 Kinondoni
 Temeke
 Dodoma Rural
 Dodoma Urban
 Kondoa
 Kongwa
 Mpwapwa
 Iringa Rural
 Iringa Urban
 Kilolo
 Ludewa
 Makete
 Mufindi
 Njombe
 Biharamulo
 Bukoba Rural
 Bukoba Urban
 Chato
 Karagwe
 Muleba
 Ngara
 Kasulu
 Kibondo
 Hai
 Moshi Rural
 Moshi Urban
 Mwanga
 Rombo
 Same
 Kilwa
 Lindi Rural
 Lindi Urban
 Liwale
 Nachingwea
 Ruangwa
 Babati
 Hanang
 Kiteto
 Mbulu
 Simanjiro
 Bunda
 Musoma Rural
 Musoma Urban
 Serengeti
 Tarime
 Rorya
 Chunya
 Ileje
 Kyela
 Mbarali
 Mbeya Rural
 Mbeya Urban
 Mbozi
 Rungwe
 Kilombero
 Kilosa
 Morogoro Rural
 Morogoro Urban
 Mvomero
 Ulanga
 Masasi
 Mtwara Rural
 Mtwara-Mikindani District
 Nanyumbu
 Newala
 Tandahimba
 Geita
 Ilemela
 Kwimba
 Magu
 Misungwi
 Nyamagana
 Sengerema
 Ukerewe
 Wete Pemba
 Micheweni Pemba
 Mkoani
 Bagamoyo
 Kibaha
 Kisarawe
 Mafia
 Mkuranga
 Rufiji
 Mpanda
 Nkasi
 Sumbawanga Rural
 Sumbawanga Urban
 Mbinga
 Songea Rural
 Songea Urban
 Tunduru
 Bariadi
 Bukombe
 Kahama
 Kishapu
 Maswa
 Meatu
 Shinyanga Rural
 Shinyanga Urban
 Iramba
 Manyoni
 Singida Rural
 Singida Urban
 Igunga
 Nzega
 Sikonge
 Uyui
 Tabora Urban
 Urambo
 Handeni
 Kilindi
 Korogwe
 Lushoto
 Muheza
 Nkinga
 Pangani
 Tanga
 Zanzibar South
 Zanzibar North "A"
 Zanzibar North "B"
 Zanzibar Urban
 Zanzibar West

Demography of Tanzania 

Demographics of Tanzania

Government and politics of Tanzania 

Politics of Tanzania
 Form of government:
 Capital of Tanzania: Dodoma
 Elections in Tanzania
 Political parties in Tanzania
 Taxation in Tanzania

Branches of the government of Tanzania

Executive branch of the government of Tanzania 
 Head of state: President of Tanzania,
 Head of government: Prime Minister of Tanzania,
 Cabinet of Tanzania

Legislative branch of the government of Tanzania 

 Parliament of Tanzania (bicameral)
 Upper house: Senate of Tanzania
 Lower house: House of Commons of Tanzania

Judicial branch of the government of Tanzania 

Court system of Tanzania

Foreign relations of Tanzania 

Foreign relations of Tanzania
 Diplomatic missions in Tanzania
 Diplomatic missions of Tanzania

International organization membership 
The United Republic of Tanzania is a member of:

African, Caribbean, and Pacific Group of States (ACP)
African Development Bank Group (AfDB)
African Union (AU)
African Union/United Nations Hybrid operation in Darfur (UNAMID)
Commonwealth of Nations
East African Community (EAC)
East African Development Bank (EADB)
Food and Agriculture Organization (FAO)
Group of 77 (G77)
Group of Six (G6)
International Atomic Energy Agency (IAEA)
International Bank for Reconstruction and Development (IBRD)
International Chamber of Commerce (ICC)
International Civil Aviation Organization (ICAO)
International Criminal Court (ICCt)
International Criminal Police Organization (Interpol)
International Development Association (IDA)
International Federation of Red Cross and Red Crescent Societies (IFRCS)
International Finance Corporation (IFC)
International Fund for Agricultural Development (IFAD)
International Labour Organization (ILO)
International Maritime Organization (IMO)
International Mobile Satellite Organization (IMSO)
International Monetary Fund (IMF)
International Olympic Committee (IOC)
International Organization for Migration (IOM)
International Organization for Standardization (ISO)
International Red Cross and Red Crescent Movement (ICRM)
International Telecommunication Union (ITU)
International Telecommunications Satellite Organization (ITSO)
International Trade Union Confederation (ITUC)
Inter-Parliamentary Union (IPU)
Multilateral Investment Guarantee Agency (MIGA)
Nonaligned Movement (NAM)
Organisation for the Prohibition of Chemical Weapons (OPCW)
Southern African Development Community (SADC)
United Nations (UN)
United Nations Conference on Trade and Development (UNCTAD)
United Nations Educational, Scientific, and Cultural Organization (UNESCO)
United Nations High Commissioner for Refugees (UNHCR)
United Nations Industrial Development Organization (UNIDO)
United Nations Interim Force in Lebanon (UNIFIL)
United Nations Mission in the Sudan (UNMIS)
United Nations Operation in Cote d'Ivoire (UNOCI)
Universal Postal Union (UPU)
World Customs Organization (WCO)
World Federation of Trade Unions (WFTU)
World Health Organization (WHO)
World Intellectual Property Organization (WIPO)
World Meteorological Organization (WMO)
World Tourism Organization (UNWTO)
World Trade Organization (WTO)

Law and order in Tanzania 

Law of Tanzania

 Tanzania Police Force
 Constitution of Tanzania
 Human rights in Tanzania
 LGBT rights in Tanzania

Military of Tanzania 

Military of Tanzania
 Command
 Commander-in-chief:
 Forces
 Army of Tanzania
 Navy of Tanzania
 Air Force of Tanzania

Local government in Tanzania 

Local government in Tanzania

History of Tanzania 

History of Tanzania
 Current events of Tanzania

Culture of Tanzania 

Culture of Tanzania
 Cuisine of Tanzania
 Languages of Tanzania
 National symbols of Tanzania
 Coat of arms of Tanzania
 Flag of Tanzania
 National anthem of Tanzania
 Prostitution in Tanzania
 Public holidays in Tanzania
 Religion in Tanzania
 Christianity in Tanzania
 Hinduism in Tanzania
 Islam in Tanzania
 Sikhism in Tanzania
 World Heritage Sites in Tanzania

Art in Tanzania 
 Music of Tanzania

Sports in Tanzania 

Sports in Tanzania
 Football in Tanzania
 Tanzania at the Olympics

Economy and infrastructure of Tanzania 

Economy of Tanzania
 Economic rank, by nominal GDP (2007): 99th (ninety-ninth)
 Agriculture in Tanzania
 Communications in Tanzania
 Internet in Tanzania
 Companies of Tanzania
Currency of Tanzania: Shilling
ISO 4217: TZS
 Energy in Tanzania
 Health care in Tanzania
 Mining in Tanzania
 Tourism in Tanzania
 Transport in Tanzania
 Airports in Tanzania
 Rail transport in Tanzania
 Water supply and sanitation in Tanzania

Education in Tanzania 

Education in Tanzania

See also 

Tanzania
List of international rankings
List of Tanzania-related topics
Member state of the Commonwealth of Nations
Member state of the United Nations
 Natural resources use in Tanzania
Outline of Africa
Outline of geography
 Poverty in Tanzania

References

External links 

The United Republic of Tanzania official site
Tanzania Tourist Board
Tanzania National Parks

Tanzania.eu

Tanzania
Outline